Jacob Jørgen Kastrup Sømme (9 January 1817 – 21 October 1893) was a Norwegian businessman, consul and politician.

Personal life
He was born in Stavanger to merchant and captain Andreas Sømme (1788–1853) and his wife Johanne Cathrine Kastrup (1789–June 1817).

In 1845 he married Johanne Margrethe "Hanna" Bull Kielland (1823–1908), youngest daughter of Jacob and Axeliane Christine Kielland and aunt of novelist Alexander Lange Kielland and painter Kitty Lange Kielland. The couple had three daughters and seven sons. Of these children one died young. Their most prominent child was painter Jacob Kielland Sømme. Their oldest daughter Johanne married jurist Ove Høegh Gude. Their sons Axel Christian Zetlitz and Andreas were businessmen, the latter was also the father of geographer Axel Christian Zetlitz Sømme. Two other sons Jonas Christian and Erling were jurists, Jonas Christian Sømme was also a local politician. The youngest daughter Maren married literary historian Gerhard Gran, whereas the youngest son Johannes Kielland Sømme became a consul.

Career
Jacob Jørgen Kastrup Sømme started his career as a businessman as a clerk in Hamburg. In 1838 he returned to Stavanger. Having married a member of the Kielland family in 1845, he became involved in the company of his father-in-law Jacob Kielland. A ship-owner, Jacob Jørgen Kastrup Sømme especially concentrated on fishing and exporting atlantic herring.

He was also vice consul for the Russian Empire in 1855 and the Netherlands in 1855. He was Knight of the Order of Saint Stanislaus.

Sømme was also involved in local politics, as mayor of Stavanger in 1859, 1860 and 1869.

References

1817 births
1893 deaths
Norwegian businesspeople
Politicians from Stavanger